The Oseidon Adventure is an audio drama based on the long-running British science fiction television series Doctor Who. This audio drama was produced by Big Finish Productions.

This is the second part of a two-part story, the first part being Trail of the White Worm.

Plot
The Kraal attempt to invade the Earth, while the Doctor is trapped on their irradiated home world, Oseidon.

Cast
The Doctor – Tom Baker
Leela – Louise Jameson
The Master – Geoffrey Beevers
Colonel Spindleton – Michael Cochrane
Marshal Grimnal / Captain Clarke – Dan Starkey
Tyngworg / Warner / UNIT R/T Operator – John Banks

Continuity
The Kraals were in the 1975 Fourth Doctor television story, The Android Invasion. That story also featured UNIT.
This is the first use of Kraals by Big Finish Productions.
The Doctor and Leela encounter the Master again in the third season of Fourth Doctor adventures, due to be released in 2014.

Critical reception
Doctor Who Magazine reviewer Matt Michael found the casting and performances excellent, but the play "slightly misjudged" as a finale.

References

External links
The Oseidon Adventure

Fourth Doctor audio plays
Master
UNIT audio plays